The Rockhampton Grammar School is an independent, co-educational, non-denominational, day and boarding school located in The Range, Rockhampton, Queensland, Australia catering to students from Early Learning through to Year 12.

The school was founded in 1881, and was originally a co-educational school before becoming an all-boys school, until 1976, when it again became co-educational.

In 2007, the Rockhampton Grammar School Early Learning Centre was established, catering for children aged six weeks to kindergarten. The centre currently cares for approximately 100 children.

The four school houses are Wheatcroft, Wheatley, Kellow and Jardine, all being named after previous headmasters. Headmaster, Islay Lee, retired at the end of the 2009 school year. Phillip Moulds, former deputy headmaster of Brisbane Grammar School, replaced him from 2010.

With approximately 350 boarding students, The Rockhampton Grammar School is the largest co-educational boarding school in Queensland.

The school has many buildings under development, including upgrades on the boys and girls dormitories to cater for the new Year 7s in 2015.

Some of the school's buildings were listed on the Queensland Heritage Register in 1992.

Alumni
 Alexander Belonogoff, Olympic rower
 J.S.S. Martin, Scottish military doctor in both World Wars
 Stephen Moore, Captain of Australian Wallabies and ACT Brumbies
 Stuart Robert, politician and former Minister for Human Services
 Alex Russell, film actor
 Cameron Thompson, 1st Federal Member for Blair in the Federal Parliament from 1997–2007, defeating Pauline Hanson Leader of One Nation.  Instrumental in the amalgamation of the Liberal Party and National Party in forming the united LNP Liberal National Party
 Sir Robin Edward Dysart Grey, banker and 6th Baronet Grey of Fallodon.

See also
List of schools in Queensland
List of boarding schools

References

Further reading

External links

Rockhampton Grammar School Website

Boarding schools in Queensland
High schools in Queensland
Educational institutions established in 1881
Nondenominational Christian schools in Queensland
Schools in Rockhampton
1881 establishments in Australia